The 1955–56 Hovedserien was the 12th completed season of top division football in Norway.

Overview
It was contested by 16 teams, and Larvik Turn won the championship, their third league title.

Teams and locations
Note: Table lists in alphabetical order.

League tables

Group A

Group B

Results

Group A

Group B

Championship final
Larvik Turn 3–2 Fredrikstad

References
Norway - List of final tables (RSSSF)

Eliteserien seasons
Norway
1
1